Frissel may refer to;

People
Seraph Frissell (1840–1915), American physician, medical writer
Toni Frissell, an American photographer, known for her fashion photography, World War II photographs and portraits
Varick Frissell, an American filmmaker born in Boston, Massachusetts

Places
Mount Frissell, located on the border of southwest Massachusetts and northwest Connecticut, is a prominent peak of the Taconic Range